John van Dreelen (born Jacques Theodore van Drielen Gimberg; 5 May 1922 – 4 September 1992) was a Dutch actor, who frequently performed on television from the 1960s to the 1980s.

Early years
Van Dreelen was born in Amsterdam, the son of Dutch actor Louis van Dreelen Gimberg and the Countess de Labouchere of Paris. He attended the Sorbonne and was fluent in several languages.

During World War II, his stage career was interrupted by the German invasion of the Netherlands. He escaped the Emslandlager labor camp near Papenburg   by disguising himself as one of the German officers, a role he would later play so often on both big and small screens.

Until 1950, his stage name was Jack Gimberg, at which time he changed it to John van Dreelen.

Television
Though he appeared in many European films, van Dreelen is best remembered as an A-list guest star in dozens of American television shows from the early 1960s to the mid-1980s, such as 12 O'Clock High, The Twilight Zone ("The Jeopardy Room"), The Man from UNCLE, Voyage to the Bottom of the Sea, The Wild Wild West, Combat!, Blue Light, Mission: Impossible and Wonder Woman. In 1962, he played the part of Ulrich in the episode "The Immigrants" on CBS's Rawhide. In 1964 he played a film producer (and murderer) in the Perry Mason episode, "The Case of the Bountiful Beauty." In 1965 he was again cast as the murderer in the episode, "The Case of the Feather Cloak."

Film
Never a major player in theatrical films, he nonetheless scored a few choice roles, including the Danish concert pianist who rescues and woos Lana Turner during an extended sequence in Madame X in 1966. Four episodes of Blue Light were edited together to create the theatrical film I Deal in Danger, which was released in December 1966 and included his appearance. His other film credits included roles in Von Ryan's Express (1965), Topaz (1969), Lost Horizon (1973), The Big Game (1973), The Clone Master (1978), The Formula (1980), The Money Pit (1986) and Born to Fight (1989), as well as TV miniseries such as The Rhinemann Exchange, The Word and Washington: Behind Closed Doors.

Stage
Van Dreelen had an international stage career and starred in a Dutch staging of My Fair Lady. He starred as Baron Von Trapp for 40 weeks in as the original American touring production of The Sound of Music. (According to the actor, Richard Rodgers wanted van Dreelen and Audrey Hepburn to play the film's leads.)

Filmography

Niet tevergeefs (1948)
But Not in Vain (1948) – Minor Role (uncredited)
Gigi (1949) – Bit Part (uncredited)
 (1952) – Lemmy Caution (segment "Je suis un tendre")
Moulin Rouge (1952) – Bit part (uncredited)
Red Roses, Red Lips, Red Wine (1953) – Hans Westhoff
Heartbroken on the Moselle (1953) – Bernd Zagler
Monte Carlo Baby (1953) – Rudy Walter
Daybreak (1954)
Ein Mädchen aus Paris (1954)
The Last Ten Days (1955) – Major Brinkmann
Bedevilled (1955) – Michel Trevelle (uncredited)
 In Hamburg When the Nights Are Long (1956) – Peter Drante
Zwei Herzen voller Seligkeit (1957) – Dieter Lorenz 
A Time to Love and a Time to Die (1958) – Political Officer
The Flying Fontaines (1959) – Victor Fontaine
The Leech Woman (1960) – Bertram Garvay
The Enemy General (1960) – Gen. Bruger
Beyond the Time Barrier (1960) – Dr. Bourman
13 Ghosts (1960) – Van Allen
The Wizard of Baghdad (1960) – Sultan Jullnar
Von Ryan's Express (1965) – Col. Gortz
Madame X (1966) – Christian Torben
I Deal in Danger (1966) – von Lindendorf
 (1967, TV Series) – Mark Lissen
 (1968) – Lawyer Kellermann
Topaz (1969) – Claude Martin
 (1972) – Jan Eckmann
Lost Horizon (1973) – Dr. Verden
The Big Game (1973) – Lee
Rufus (1975) – Marcel
Too Hot to Handle (1977) – MacKenzie Portman
The Clone Master (1978) – Salt
The Formula (1980) – Hans Lehman, Prefect of Police Berlin
Hart to Hart (1983) – Henri Beaumont
The Money Pit (1986) – Carlos 
Mascara (1987) – Minister Weinberger
Odyssée d'amour (1987) – Dr. Alexander De Winter
Zoeken naar Eileen (1987) – Philips vader
Born to Fight (1989) – Gen. Weber
Gummibärchen küßt man nicht (1989) – Geyer
Operation Las Vegas (1990) – Parker
Becoming Colette (1991) – Albert

References

External links

 
 
 

1922 births
1992 deaths
Dutch male film actors
Dutch male television actors
Male actors from Amsterdam
20th-century Dutch male actors
Dutch male stage actors
University of Paris alumni
Dutch expatriates in France